Gabriel Barkay (born 1944) (Hebrew: גבריאל ברקאי; sometimes transcribed from the Hebrew Gavriel Barkai) is an Israeli archaeologist.

Biography
Gabriel Barkay was born in the Budapest Ghetto, Hungary, he immigrated to Israel in 1950.

He studied archaeology, comparative religion and geography at Tel Aviv University, graduated summa cum laude, and received his PhD in Archaeology from the same university in 1985. His dissertation was about LMLK seal impressions on jar handles. He participated in the Lachish excavations with David Ussishkin. His academic areas of interest include the archaeology of Jerusalem, biblical archaeology, burials and burial customs, art, epigraphy, and glyptics in the Iron Age.

Teaching and academic career
Barkay is an external lecturer at Bar Ilan University and Jerusalem University College on Mount Zion.

Archaeology career

First Temple Period tombs
In 1968-71, Barkay and David Ussishkin surveyed the Silwan necropolis from the time of the Judean Monarchy during the Iron Age, containing 50 rock-cut tombs of Judahite high government officials. Barkay also excavated the Iron Age tombs on the grounds of the École Biblique in the early 1970s.

Priestly Blessing scrolls

Dr. Barkay's most famous discoveries are two small silver scroll amulets containing the priestly benediction from the Book of Numbers, which he discovered in 1979 in a First Temple Period tomb at Ketef Hinnom. These amulets contain the oldest surviving biblically-related inscription discovered to date, dating back to the seventh century BCE and are to-date the only archaeological proof that passages from the Hebrew Bible as we know them were in circulation in the First Temple Period.

Temple Mount Sifting Project

In 2005, together with archaeologist Zachi Zweig, Barkay established the Temple Mount Sifting Project, a project funded by the Ir David Foundation and dedicated to recovering archaeological artifacts from 400 truckloads of earth removed from the Temple Mount by the Waqf and Israeli Islamic movement during 1996–2001. The construction included the establishment of the underground so-called El-Marwani Mosque at an ancient structure known since medieval times as Solomon's Stables, excavating a huge pit as an entrance to the structure, and reducing the platform level at the area north to the entrance.

One of the findings of this project is a 7th-century BCE bulla (round clay seal affixed to documents), which became known as the "Bethlehem Seal". Dr. Barkay offered the first translation of the Hebrew three-line inscription: "In the 7th year, Bethlehem, for the king".

Barkay points out to the findings from the Byzantine period—mainly ceramics and coins, including rare coins, but also architectural elements, some from churches. Some scholars claim that the Temple Mount was left bare by the Christian rulers, to conform with Jesus' prophecy  that not a stone of the Temple complex will be left standing and in order to emphasise the Church of the Resurrection, but in Barkay's assessment, the findings prove that "in the Byzantine era the Temple Mount was a center of activity", as the place may have held churches and a marketplace.

Media career
Barkay frequently appears on the History Channel show The Naked Archaeologist, which is hosted by Simcha Jacobovici. He also appeared in the documentary The Real Da Vinci Code in 2005, hosted by British actor Tony Robinson of Blackadder fame, offering his views on the speculation that the Templars found secret documents relating to the bloodline of Jesus Christ under the Temple Mount as advanced by Michael Baigent, Richard Leigh, and Henry Lincoln in their controversial book The Holy Blood and the Holy Grail. In Barkay's opinion, there exists no evidence that the Templars conducted any excavations in the area at all, and that the tools available to them at the time were not sufficient to dig far enough to reach the ruins in question. Also in 2005, Barkay appeared in the documentary The Bible vs. the Book of Mormon, produced by Living Hope Ministries of Brigham City, Utah, in which he was asked to give his opinion on the extent to which archaeological findings support the historical narrative presented in the Bible.

Awards and recognition
In 1996, Barkay received the Jerusalem Prize for his life's work as an archaeologist of Jerusalem.

In 2014 he received the Moskowitz Prize for Zionism.

References

External links
 The Temple Mount Sifting Project

 Gabriel Barkay interview  about the Silvan necropolis work after 1967. Tower of David Museum of the History of Jerusalem, "50 Years, 50 Faces" documentary project.

1944 births
Academic staff of the Hebrew University of Jerusalem
Living people
Israeli archaeologists
Israeli people of Hungarian-Jewish descent
Moskowitz Prize for Zionism laureates